Pogorzelec may refer to the following places:
Pogorzelec, Lublin Voivodeship (east Poland)
Pogorzelec, Podlaskie Voivodeship (north-east Poland)
Pogorzelec, Subcarpathian Voivodeship (south-east Poland)
Pogorzelec, Garwolin County in Masovian Voivodeship (east-central Poland)
Pogorzelec, Pułtusk County in Masovian Voivodeship (east-central Poland)
Pogorzelec, Węgrów County in Masovian Voivodeship (east-central Poland)